Doguzhiyev is a rural locality (a khutor) in Yelenovskoye Rural Settlement of Krasnogvardeysky District, Adygea, Russia. The population was 10 as of 2018. There are 4 streets.

Geography 
Doguzhiyev is located 19 km east of Krasnogvardeyskoye (the district's administrative centre) by road. Nekrasovskaya is the nearest rural locality.

References 

Rural localities in Krasnogvardeysky District